General Maister Barracks is a barracks of the Slovenian Armed Forces in Maribor, named after general Rudolf Maister.

It is the location of one of two Slovenian infantry brigades, the 72nd Brigade, and its subordinate units.

Units 
 Current
 72nd Brigade
 37th vojaškoteritorialno Command Maribor 
 74th armored-mechanized battalion of the Slovenian Armed Forces 
 72nd Command-logistics company of the Slovenian Army

References 

Barracks in Slovenia
Maribor